Els Guiamets is a municipality in the comarca of the Priorat in Catalonia, Spain. It is situated in the south of the comarca. A local road links the village to the N-420 road between Falset and Móra la Nova. The Guiamets reservoir is on an affluent of the Siurana (Tarragona).

History
In medieval times the town was part of the Barony of Entença.

Notable people 
 Neus Català (1915-2019), member of the Unified Socialist Party of Catalonia (PSUC) during Spanish Civil War. She was the only Spanish survivor of the concentration camp of Ravensbrück.

Demography

References

 Panareda Clopés, Josep Maria; Rios Calvet, Jaume; Rabella Vives, Josep Maria (1989). Guia de Catalunya, Barcelona: Caixa de Catalunya.  (Spanish).  (Catalan).

External links
Els Guiamets website
 Government data pages 

Municipalities in Priorat
Populated places in Priorat